John Robertson (born 8 January 1974) is an English former footballer who played professionally for Wigan Athletic and Lincoln City. He also played for a number of non-league clubs, including Southport, Stalybridge Celtic, Leigh RMI, Lancaster City, and Runcorn.

Honours

Club
Leigh RMI
Lancashire FA Challenge Trophy (1): 2002−03

References

External links

1974 births
Living people
Footballers from Liverpool
English footballers
Association football defenders
Wigan Athletic F.C. players
Lincoln City F.C. players
Southport F.C. players
Stalybridge Celtic F.C. players
Leigh Genesis F.C. players
Lancaster City F.C. players
Runcorn F.C. Halton players